John Allen Garwood (July 8, 1932 – November 30, 2010) was a Republican member of the North Carolina General Assembly, who represented the state's thirtieth Senate district, including constituents in Stokes, Surry and Wilkes counties, for five terms (1997–2006). A retiree from North Wilkesboro, North Carolina, Garwood also served as a county commissioner and as a member of the state House of Representatives before being elected to the Senate.

Garwood was defeated by David Blust in the May 4, 2006 Republican primary. He died November 30, 2010 at the age of 78.

References

External links

|-

|-

County commissioners in North Carolina
North Carolina state senators
Members of the North Carolina House of Representatives
2010 deaths
1932 births
21st-century American politicians